The Cloyd Conglomerate is a geologic group in Virginia. It preserves fossils dating back to the Carboniferous period.

See also

 List of fossiliferous stratigraphic units in Virginia
 Paleontology in Virginia

References 

Geologic formations of Virginia
Devonian System of North America
Famennian Stage
Conglomerate formations